Bhoomi Kosam is a Telugu-language film directed by K. B. Tilak in 1974. It is one of the earliest films to portray far left politics in the Telugu language.

Story 

The film is about a village's liberation, where the people want to be free from the tyranny of Zamindari. One of Zamindar's sons leads the revolt. The film represents of the efforts of left-wing political parties. The film was dedicated to the memory of Tilak's brother Ramanarasimha Rao who was 'encountered' in 1972.

Cast 

The cast included Ashok Kumar, Gummadi, Jaggayya, Jamuna, Prabhakar Reddy and Chalam, Prabha. It was Jaya Prada's début. She was given this screen name for this film as suggested by M.Prabhakar Reddy.

Writing 

The film features lyrics and script by Srirangam Srinivasa Rao (Sri Sri) who was a prominent intellectual and poet of Andhra Pradesh and K.G Satyamurthy (Shivasagar) who was the founder of the People's War Group.

References 

1970s Telugu-language films
Films directed by K. B. Tilak